Bruce Eugene Westerman (born November 18, 1967) is an American politician serving as the U.S. representative for Arkansas's 4th congressional district. Previously, he served as member and the majority leader of the Arkansas House of Representatives.

In 2014, Westerman was elected to the House to succeed Tom Cotton, who defeated U.S. Senator Mark Pryor in the 2014 Senate election.

Background
Westerman was raised in and resides in Hot Springs, Arkansas. He graduated as valedictorian of Fountain Lake High School in Hot Springs. He attended the University of Arkansas in Fayetteville, where he played college football for the Arkansas Razorbacks football team. He graduated with a Bachelor of Science in engineering in 1990 and subsequently received a master's degree in forestry from Yale University.

Westerman worked as an engineer and forester before being elected to the Arkansas House in 2010. He was formerly employed as an engineer and forester by the Mid-South Engineering Company. He served as president of the Arkansas chapter of the American Society of Agricultural and Biological Engineering. He is also a former chair of the Arkansas Academy of Biological and Agricultural Engineers, and served on the Fountain Lake School District school board.

Arkansas House of Representatives

Elections
Westerman ran for the Arkansas House of Representatives in 2010.

Tenure
Westerman served as the House Minority Leader in 2012 and House Majority Leader in 2013.

Committee assignments
 Revenue And Taxation Committee
 Subcommittee on Sales, Use, Miscellaneous Taxes and Exemptions (chair)
 State Agencies And Governmental Affairs Committee
 Insurance and Commerce Committee

U.S. House of Representatives

2014 election
Westerman won the Republican primary on May 20, defeating Tommy Moll, 54%–46%. In November, he defeated Democratic nominee James Lee Witt, a former associate of U.S. President Bill Clinton, 54%-43%.

Tenure 
In 2015, Westerman cosponsored a resolution to amend the US constitution to ban same-sex marriage.

On June 20, 2017, as the only certified forester in the House, Westerman introduced H.R.2936 - Resilient Federal Forests Act of 2017, providing for the culling of overgrown federally managed woods. After passing the House, it was introduced in the Senate on November 2, 2017, where it failed.

Westerman voted for the Tax Cuts and Jobs Act of 2017.

In December 2020, Westerman was one of 126 Republican members of the House of Representatives to sign an amicus brief in support of Texas v. Pennsylvania, a lawsuit filed at the United States Supreme Court contesting the results of the 2020 presidential election, in which Joe Biden defeated incumbent Donald Trump. The Supreme Court declined to hear the case on the basis that Texas lacked standing under Article III of the Constitution to challenge the results of an election held by another state.

During the 2021 Capitol riot, Westerman, left behind in House minority leader Kevin McCarthy's office when he was evacuated by security, took a Civil War sword from a shattered display for protection and hid from rioters on a toilet.

As of October 2021, Westerman had voted in line with Joe Biden's stated position 8% of the time.

Committee assignments
In the 117th Congress, Westerman serves on the:

 Committee on Natural Resources (Chair)
 Transportation and Infrastructure Committee
 Subcommittee on Railroads, Pipelines, and Hazardous Materials
 Subcommittee on Water Resources and Environment
 Subcommittee on Highways and Transit

In the 114th Congress, Westerman served on the:
Committee on the Budget
Committee on Natural Resources
Subcommittee on Federal Lands
Subcommittee on Oversight and Investigations
Committee on Science, Space and Technology
Subcommittee on Environment (vice chair)
Subcommittee on Research and Technology

Caucus memberships

 Congressional Sportsmen's Caucus
 Congressional Western Caucus
 Republican Study Committee
 Working Forests Caucus (co-chair, co-founder)
 Dyslexia Caucus (co-chair)
 U.S.-Japan Caucus

Political positions

Abortion

Westerman believes that "Life is a right. Abortion is not." He supported the 2022 overturning of Roe v. Wade.

Gun law

Westerman has a 92% rating from the National Rifle Association for his pro-gun rights legislative voting record. He voted against the Enhanced Background Checks Act in 2021.

Electoral history

References

External links
 U.S. Representative Bruce Westerman official U.S. House website
 Bruce Westerman for Congress
 
 
 

|-

|-

|-

|-

1967 births
21st-century American politicians
21st-century American engineers
Arkansas Razorbacks football players
Baptists from Arkansas
Baptists from the United States
Engineers from Arkansas
Fountain Lake High School alumni
Living people
Republican Party members of the Arkansas House of Representatives
Politicians from Hot Springs, Arkansas
Protestants from Arkansas
School board members in Arkansas
Yale School of Forestry & Environmental Studies alumni
Republican Party members of the United States House of Representatives from Arkansas